The British Construction Industry Awards (BCI Awards or BCIA) were launched by New Civil Engineer magazine and Thomas Telford Ltd in 1998, at the time both owned by the Institution of Civil Engineers.

The awards seek to recognise outstanding achievement in the construction of buildings, taking account of a wide range of factors including architectural and engineering design, but also consideration of the construction process, delivery to time and budget, and client satisfaction.

In 2012, Network Rail chief executive Sir David Higgins was the chair of the British Construction Industry Awards judging panel which celebrated its 25th anniversary of rewarding excellence in UK construction delivery.

In June 2017 owners of New Civil Engineer, Ascential, sold the title to Metropolis International who now operate the BCIAs in association with the Institution of Civil Engineers.

The awards are typically held in October each year. In 2020, the British Construction Industry Awards will be held on the evening of Wednesday 28 October at the JW Marriott Grosvenor House Hotel on Park Lane in London.

Award winners

2019

2018

2017

2016

2015

2014

2013

2012

2011

2010

2005

2004

2003

2002

See also
 List of engineering awards

References

External links
 BCI Awards
 New Civil Engineer
 Institution of Civil Engineers

1998 establishments in the United Kingdom
Architecture awards
Architecture in the United Kingdom
Awards established in 1998
Construction Industry
British science and technology awards
Civil engineering awards
Construction and civil engineering companies of the United Kingdom
Institution of Civil Engineers